Pirate radio in Ireland has had a long history, with hundreds of pirate radio stations having operated within the country.

Due to past lax enforcement of the rules, the lack of commercial radio until 1989, and the small physical size of the country, pirate radio stations proliferated for a number of years.

They were tolerated to a point by the government which only occasionally raided them in an effort to show compliance with Irish law. However, the national broadcaster, RTÉ, took a harsher approach, including radio jamming.

History

20th century
Pirate radio in Ireland has its origins in the early and mid-20th century. In 1940, for example, Mayo man Jack Sean McNeela died on hunger strike in Arbour Hill Military Detention Barracks after 55 days protesting his arrest for operating a pro IRA pirate radio station.

While the number of recorded pirate radio stations was in the hundreds, only a few have been notable enough to be remembered. Pirate radio reached its height of popularity in Ireland in the 1980s after Sunshine Radio and Radio Nova were launched in Dublin. They were soon joined by others.

It was commercial music radio at a time when state broadcaster RTÉ struggled to capture the youth market. This was followed by the arrival in 1982 of South Coast Radio, ABC Tramore and Radio ERI in Cork. These were pirate radio stations run for the first time on a commercial basis with the critical support of Ireland's advertising industry based in Dublin.

Radio Nova in Dublin, launched as a 'clutter-free' radio station, was arguably the catalyst for a sea change in radio in Ireland.

Professional market research conducted in the 1980s by reputable market research companies such as Lansdowne Research, Irish Marketing Surveys and Behaviours and Attitudes showed that these radio stations consistently led RTE in terms of reach and market share.

In Cork, Radio ERI had a consistent reach in excess of 50% with a reach of 63% recorded in 1986/87, an unprecedented listenership figure. The station boasted an extensive marketing and sales department which produced no fewer than six future local radio managing directors or chief executives throughout Ireland under the legalised regime after 1989.

In 1988 it, along with stations such as Sunshine and Q102 run by Mike Hogan (who was the first managing director of Dublin ILR franchise holder Capital Radio in 1989) and owned by nightclub impresario Pierre Doyle, had annual sales revenues in millions of pounds.

These commercial radio stations and others such as Radio West in Mullingar, Coast 103 FM in Galway and WLR in Waterford changed the landscape of radio in Ireland.

The outcry and public protest which galvanised the country in 1983, when Radio Nova and Sunshine were raided, lead to a position where successive Irish governments refrained from action and tacitly accepted the super pirates.

Many politicians, including future Taoisigh and ministers, were guests on these stations interviewed by well organised news departments.

This led to a new Radio and Television Act in 1988 which paved the way, with the cooperation of nearly all pirate radio stations, to a new era in independent local radio in Ireland which commenced in 1989.

It was a great success and offered secure employment to many pirate radio stars who have since thrived and been joined by younger broadcasters over the decades in a flourishing local radio industry.

The 1988 Act effectively limited future pirate radio stations by making it illegal to advertise or support them with stiff penalties. The 1980s were therefore the heyday of pirate radio in Ireland.

Unlike other countries, Irish pirate stations were almost always on land, with publicly available phone numbers and addresses, advertising and known presenters. A recent government crackdown now means Ireland has one of the most hardline anti-pirate policies in Europe , and few major stations survive.

Stations nowadays are usually FM-based. In the 1980s however, most major stations broadcast on both MW and FM. There have also been several shortwave pirate stations in Ireland, but pirate shortwave broadcasting has declined greatly, as with SW broadcasting in general. The early pioneering pirates were usually MW only.

One of the first stations was Radio Milinda which broadcast on 300 metres MW. It was the first radio station to be raided and prosecuted. It was raided on the 17 December 1972 and the subsequent court case took place on the 8 February 1973. They were fined £2 each and their equipment was confiscated.

21st century
In 2002 a new radio regulation body, the Commission for Communications Regulation (ComReg), was founded by the Irish government to replace the Office of the Director of Telecommunications Regulation (ODTR). Part of the reason for the change was pressure from the licensed radio community, which felt that pirate operators were taking their listeners, and that a level playing field needed to be restored.

ComReg had much more funding, staff and resources than its predecessor – and these were put to use in May 2003, when a major crackdown on Dublin pirates saw virtually every station wiped off the band. This series of raids, which was conducted over two days and involved Garda Síochána officers and ESB staff, was referred to as "Black Tuesday" by the free radio community.

Follow-up action in the years to come meant that any station that ventured on air usually didn't last that long – with the officials often tracking down and closing operators sometimes within five working days. The hardline stance has also been extended to other pirate heartlands such as Cork, Limerick and the border counties. For the first time, ComReg began to carry out raids at night and weekends – removing the only remaining "safe" time to broadcast without a licence.

Today Ireland has few pirate stations. In Dublin a couple venture on air mainly at the weekends, using low power. Outside Dublin there are a few larger, full-time operators left, but they generally don't tend to last long. Stations which operate intermittently, or regularly change name and/or location tend to survive longer (many have never been raided) although obviously have more difficulty building up a substantial listenership and hence are perceived as being less of a threat to the licensed stations.

ComReg's policy has come under criticism from many in the radio industry, who believe that the organisation should focus its resources on stations that cause interference, rather than simply carrying out blanket raids on all stations. These critics point out that while a mechanism has been put in place to remove pirates within a week, little has been done to free up the procedures for starting a licensed radio station. They call for a more tolerant attitude towards benevolent pirates, until a framework is introduced to allow niche stations to be set up and run at low cost with less strict regulation.

Many of the remaining stations are so-called "Border Blasters", which operate from just inside the Republic of Ireland, in counties Cavan, Donegal and Monaghan and broadcasting with directional antennas into Northern Ireland.

These stations had been generally more tolerated by Comreg/ODTR/DOC due to the broadcasts being aimed across the border, and not taking advertising or listenership to a significant degree from stations licensed by the BCI. However, in recent years the main border pirates have been the target of repeated raids, with the largest stations forced off-air.

A significant increase in the number of legal FM radio stations in Northern Ireland and increased cross-border co-operation between COMREG and the UK's OFCOM has led to this increased action towards the 'Border Blasters'

In some cases, the issuing of licences to new stations to broadcast in a genre traditionally served by pirate radio has led to local pirates closing down as their listeners, staff and advertisers move to the licensed station. In Dublin, SPIN 1038 took much of the youth-oriented audience and Dublin's Country Mix 106.8 took from country music pirates.

An addition to pirate radio, particularly in the late 1990s has been a number of Catholic churches, particularly in rural areas, who broadcast their services at the high frequency end of the FM band, or on frequencies around 27 MHz (an arrangement not permitted by legal 27 MHz CB) for parishioners who cannot attend personally.

The high end of the FM band was favoured by church broadcasters using the domestic FM band, as this was mostly unused for legal stations outside Dublin and Cork. The church broadcasters were largely ignored until 2006 when Comreg contacted a number of churches warning them to stop the transmissions, and claimed the broadcasts were suspected of interfering with airband frequencies.

(A few months after this move the high end of the FM band became populated by transmitters for the almost national roll-out of Newstalk radio, which previously broadcast to Dublin only - these broadcasts were not accused of interfering with airband frequencies).

The 2006 controversy made international news, after the issue was aired on RTÉ's Liveline radio show. Shortly afterward the authorities introduced a new licence scheme (similar to one in the UK) that would allow a frequency band just above the legal 27 MHz CB band to be used for this purpose.

Listeners would have to purchase scanners or other special receivers capable of receiving 27.5–28 MHz.

Another form of religious broadcast to appear in Ireland in the 1990s was the many FM and AM relays of the UK-based UCB (United Christian Broadcasters) and to a lesser extent the related CrossRhythms station from satellite. However these re-broadcasts have now mostly ceased.

Notable stations

Dublin

Radio Dublin
Radio Dublin started in 1966 founded by Ken Sheehan, and peaked in the late 1970s and up unto the early 1980s until the arrival of Radio Nova and Sunshine radio whose professionalism and quality stereo reception left the station adrift in their wake in the subsequent years. Radio Dublin broadcast on MW, SW and FM simultaneously.

After Eamonn Cooke took over, Radio Dublin had ever increasing ambitions. It was the first radio station in the Republic of Ireland to complete a 24-hour broadcast, this on the occasion of the Irish general election of June 1977. The broadcast was hosted by Roland Burke and David Moore. The "marathon" broadcast over the following Christmas, of at least 185 hours was history in the making leading the way into really a new world of 1978. It was for many years accepted as just another radio station, with little being known about its lack of a licence.  The station ceased full-time operation after the jailing of the station's then-owner Eamonn Cooke for child sex offences which took place at the radio station,
 
staff at the station destroyed much of the equipment in Inchicore  in anger at Cooke. Radio Dublin closed down in May 2003 and has never returned. Cooke died in June 2016.

Radio Milinda
Radio Milinda started Broadcasting early in 1972. It was the first pirate radio station to be raided and prosecuted in the republic of Ireland. On 17 December 1972 a large contingent of police raided Radio Milinda and seven people were arrested. They were fined £2 each and all equipment and media was confiscated. Radio Milinda broadcast on 300 metres M.W. Radio Milinda was believed to have been one of the most professional sounding stations of the day having a broad listener base in Ireland as well as the UK.

Sunshine Radio and Radio Nova "The Super Pirates"
Sunshine Radio was the first of the so-called Super Pirate radio stations in the Republic of Ireland and commenced broadcasting on 9 September 1980 from studios in the Sands Hotel, Portmarnock, County Dublin. It was the longest operating of the major stations. Sunshine closed at the end of 1988 having achieved the highest ratings of any Dublin radio station to this day. Their head office was in JWT House in Baggot Street in the heart of the city's commercial district. Sunshine Radio was set up by former Radio Caroline men Chris Cary, Robbie Robinson, aka Robbie Dale, and ex-BBC broadcast engineer Jimmy White with some financial support from one of Radio Caroline's partners Phil Solomon. Shortly after making its first test transmissions the station's main aerial tower was vandalised and subsequently collapsed. Cary and Solomon backed out of the venture and sold to Dale only weeks after the station opened. Sunshine Radio started on 531 kHz (announced as 539 metres) medium wave, adding an FM service a year later. Chris Cary went on to start Radio Nova in the following year, 1981, with studios in Herbert Street, Dublin.  Nova was the first major Irish pirate to commence with FM, on 88.1 MHz (it ended up on 102.7 MHz). The station added an AM frequency at a later stage which varied between 819 kHz, 828 kHz, 846 kHz and 738 kHz. After the success of Radio Nova on FM, Robbie Robinson broadcast Sunshine at high power on 101 MHz, and renamed the station Sunshine 101. Nova ran until 1986 when Chris Cary closed the station following a dispute with the National Union of Journalists. Other stations came on air like Q102 some claiming a Cary connection like NRG 103 (some thought that "NRG" was an abbreviation for "Nova Radio Group"), but the name sounded like Energy 103 and Power FM, but none were able to come near to the Nova or Sunshine success. Sunshine 101 dominated the Dublin radio market until it closed down at the end of December 1988 in compliance with the new Broadcasting & Wireless Telegraphy act, which had come into effect at midnight on 31 December that year. Many of the present-day stars of Irish broadcasting are proud to acknowledge their early days as part of the teams to come out of Sunshine and Nova.

The stations provided 24-hour music, with hourly news updates to Dublin City and County. The stations were raided only once, in 1983, leaving Nova off the air for less than a week and Sunshine a little longer because it waited for the District Court to order the return of its equipment confiscated in the raid. Pirate radio had a very noticeable impact on both listener figures and the advertising revenue of RTÉ, which could resort only to frequency jamming of the Nova and Sunshine MW & FM transmitters to try to reduce listenership. The Irish communications minister ordered the then chairman of RTÉ Fred O'Donovan to stop the illegal jamming campaign.

Well-known names in radio associated with the superpirates Sunshine Radio, Radio Nova, Nova's sister stations, Magic 103, Q102 or Energy 103 include: now retired broadcasters Bob Gallico and Peter Madison, 2FM's Colm Hayes and John Clarke, Today FM's Tom Hardy, Phil Cawley and Tony Fenton, FM104's Dave Kelly, Alan Hunter (now consulting in Broadcasting and online radio), licensed Q102's Scott Williams, Gerry Stevens, Liam Coburn, Aidan Cooney and Ernie Gallagher (now at Radio Nova), licensed Sunshine 106.8's David Dennehy and Jim Kenny, licensed Radio Nova's Greg Gaughren and Pat Courtenay, Radio 1's John Kenny, East Coast FM's Declan Meehan (also on Sundays on Today FM), 4FM's Gareth O'Callaghan (ex-2FM and Galway Bay FM), and David Harvey. TV would include RTÉ News and Sports' Brian Dobson, Anna Cassin, Brian Jennings and Eamonn Falvey and TV3's Aidan Cooney (also on Q102), Martin King (also on Q102), Andrew O'Hanlon and Jim Cotter, host and producer of the PBS television show Articulate.

Smaller stations of the late 1970s, early 1980s
Other memorable pirate stations in Dublin included Radio Dublin, Capitol Radio (Alternative Music station which from September 1986 had an alter ego station Nitesky 96FM), Big D, Radio City, TTTR (Country Music) and ARD (Alternative Radio Dublin - based in Drimnagh then at the Crofton Airport Hotel in Whitehall). Amongst the DJs at the Big D were Chris Wilkinson, Dennis Murray and also Dj Shagnasty. Well-known names on radio and television that went through these smaller stations would include many of those who would go on to superpirates as listed above, but also people who left the pirate scene just before the superpirates emerged such as Marty Whelan, Gerry Ryan, Dave Fanning, John Paul, Ian Dempsey and Robbie Irwin.
North Dublin Community Radio (a forerunner to NEAR FM), was a local community-based radio station, which operated in the Northside of Dublin broadcasting on 100 MHz FM and on 1008 kHz AM.

XFM
XFM was seen as one of the grandads of operating pirates in Ireland, having run almost continuously since 1991, when it was called Alice's Restaurant; Although other stations such as Radio Star Country, shortwave pirate Jolly Roger Radio/Riverside Radio and EFR/Choice FM (Mayo) have been around longer. XFM played mainly alternative, indie and rock music. The station was founded by music and electronics enthusiast Andrew Hartnett and his brother David. The playlist initially was created by Hugh O'Brien and heavily featured artists from labels such as 4AD, Beggars Banquet and similar. Its popularity peaked in the early to mid-'90s with the explosion of UK indie and US grunge music from labels such as Sub-Pop. Armed with a MiniDisc recorder Andrew and Hugh managed to acquire snippet interviews with artists such as PJ Harvey, David Gedge, Kelley Deal, Jarvis Cocker and others. Glen Hansard performed a one-off live session from the studio. Shows included the 'Chillage Idiots' with their weekly programme introducing mainly 'electronic music' artists. The station was one of the first to stream on the internet in 1995 using the Real Audio system. Much studio footage was video recorded and is still available on YouTube. Xfm's studios were based in Walkinstown, with a UHF link to an old piggery at Kiltipper in Dublin's south west where the FM transmitter was located. In 2002 Xfm's transmitter was stolen from the mountain location. A benefit gig was organised in the then Temple Bar Music Centre which was a success and the station purchased a new transmitter, returning to the air almost three months following the theft. Xfm operated on 107.5 MHz and moved to 107.9 MHz due to the FM spectrum being busy with adjacent pirates. The station did not receive any governmental action beyond inspectors observing the transmission site.

Xfm continued broadcasting on FM until 2005. Thereafter the station continued online programming at xfmdublin.com  Some of the presenters moved on to professional broadcasters, including Lolo Wood (BBC), David Layde (Radio Nova). A Facebook page is still maintained today 'XfmDublin'.

Kiss 103FM
Kiss 103 FM launched in March 1993 with a powerful signal on 103.2 MHz. It was marked at the time as being the first 'commercial' pirate station to operate since the 'super pirates' of the 1980s. Kiss FM was unique amongst the pirates of the time in that it was heavily formatted and operated twenty-four hours per day. With studios in Terenure in South West Dublin (located in a flat above the Xtra-Vision Video Rental Shop on the Whitehall Road, Terenure), the station linked via UHF links to transmitters at Kilakee in the Dublin mountains. The station was regarded at the time to have attracted the best of the talent from the burgeoning pirate scene – as well as several presenters who had worked on the pirate stations of the 1980s. The station was an instant success, attracting the wrath of commercial operators and the Government regulator. Over the course of its eight-month existence, the station's signals were jammed repeatedly by FM104, one of the (then) only two licensed commercial operators for the Dublin area, and its various mountain transmitter sites were raided by the Department of Communications. Kiss 103 finally closed in November 1994. No station in the history of pirate radio in Ireland experienced as much Government action as did Kiss 103. The station's transmitter sites were raided four times in eight months, while its studio site was raided on two occasions, resulting in losses of expensive broadcasting equipment.

Kiss 103 was said to have caused a change in the attitude of the Government and the commercial radio sector toward unlicensed radio; prior to its launch, a number of hobby pirates had operated with relative impunity – Radio Dublin, DLR 106, Sunset Radio, NSR, Coast FM, Kiss FM (which changed its name prior to the launch of Kiss 103), Radio Active and others. In the months after the closedown of Kiss 103, only three pirates remained on air in Dublin – Coast FM, Club FM (Dance) and DLR 106.

Freedom 92FM
This station broadcast for seven years, serving Dublin city and surrounding areas. Playing non-stop chart music, it was hugely successful, with a large youth audience and many high-profile DJs. It distinguished itself from other Dublin stations through its relaxed on-air approach, with presenters you could identify with, few advertisements and no news coverage to interrupt the music.

The station was removed from the air by the Black Tuesday raids in May 2003 (see Pirate radio today). Some Freedom DJs now work for licensed Dublin stations.

Pulse FM 103.2
Pulse FM began life as a garden shed-based radio station, as with others in this list. However, Pulse was driven strongly by commercial forces from the beginning. On air from 1995 to 1999, its existence coincided with a population boom in the 18- to 25-year-old age bracket. Pulse derived much of its income from promoting underage and overage discos in suburban Dublin, and as promoters and operators, the station management made substantial sums from this as well as advertising DJ hire services. Filed accounts at the CRO (No. 288948) confirm the financial success of the station. Its backers invested heavily in CTE transmission and modulation equipment, producing a slick, clean FM sound, clearly received all over the Greater Dublin Area.

Pulse FM was characterised by professional, well spoken, south Dublin posh accented DJs contrasting with the majority of other Dublin pirates at the time. Heavily playlisted, slick voiceovers and jingle work all combined to make Pulse FM extremely successful.

Prior to its closure, Pulse FM's owners commissioned an 'independent' report which put Pulse on a par with currently licensed commercial stations such as FM104 and 98FM.

Pulse FM formed a consortium to apply for the new 'Youth Music' station licence, offered by the IRTC. However, this application was not successful.

Quite a few former deejays with Pulse FM are currently on licensed radio. They include Declan Pearse (Today FM), Daragh O'Dea (FM104), Chris Murray (LMFM), Al Gibbs (FM104) and Kevin Brannigan (Radio Nova - CEO). Co-founder and deejay Daragh O'Sullivan, aka Steven Davitt, and deejay Garvin Rigby are amongst the founders of Christmas FM.

Phantom FM
Phantom FM began broadcasting to Dublin in 1997 from a garden shed in Sandyford. (previously it had broadcast under various names including Spectrum FM from Ballybrack) Arguably one of the most successful pirate stations of the 1990s, Phantom played mainly indie music which had a huge underground following in Dublin. This market which was completely ignored by the mainstream radio stations at the time which accounts for the success Phantom enjoyed. The unlicensed Phantom FM came to an end in the May 2003 crackdown on Dublin pirate radio stations. One of two transmitter sites used at the time by Phantom was raided by Comreg, however, the studio in the city centre was untouched. Phantom briefly returned to the air on the Sunday afternoon following the raids, with a broadcast of its 'Anorak' programme, before finally closing as a pirate.

Phantom were notable that they were the first of post-1989 pirate stations to broadcast legally in Ireland when the Broadcasting Commission of Ireland awarded temporary licences on 2 occasions to the station. Phantom subsequently won the competition for an Alternative Music licence in November 2004, but due to legal challenges from one of the losing consortia (Zed FM/scrollside FM), it only went on air at the end of October 2006 with its new licence. Claims by the consortium, backed by Bob Geldof, Hot Press owner Niall Stokes and businessman Dermot Hanrahan, that Phantom's application benefited from their years of illegal broadcasting and a claimed infringement with its temporary licences were rejected.

Phantom has had a mixture of very experienced pirate broadcasters and some new talent during its different phases from unlicensed broadcasting right up to its current permanent licensed state. The Chief Executive Ger Roe goes back to Radio Dublin Channel 2, circa 1982. General Manager Simon Maher had built up experience in a few pirates, starting in 1990 with Radio Dublin, and was the key figure in setting up Coast FM from his garden shed in Ballybrack. Steve Conway (some-time Phantom presenter and writer), who goes back to '80s pirates, has the distinction of having been involved in the most famous off-shore pirate Radio Caroline during the late '80s and the '90s.

In 2010 Communicorp became a major shareholder in Phantom. Numerous changes, including staff layoffs, have been made to the station since 2011 as it struggled to make an impression in an increasingly competitive Dublin market and in a recession-hit economy. Some of the station founders left Phantom, including Simon Maher, Ger Roe and Sinister Pete. In March 2014, a number of Phantom staff were laid off - both presenters and behind the scene. Long-time presenters such as Jack Hyland, Ritchie McCormack and Ritche Ryan lost their jobs. The Phantom brand officially ceased around midnight 16 March. The station called itself 105.2 FM until Monday 31 March, when it relaunched itself as TXFM with a new schedule. Some Phantom presenters from the pirate era survived these changes including John Caddell and Cathal Funge. TXFM ceased airing in October 2016.

Various ex-Phantom presenters from the pirate era have surfaced on other stations, such as Keith Walsh, Cormac Battle and Dan Hegarty on 2FM, Ritchie McCormack on Newstalk, Alison Curtis on Today FM and Jack Hyland on Radio Nova (Dublin-based rock station). Simon Maher, the original founder, set up an online station called 8Radio.com in 2013, which has also had a series of temporary FM licences around various parts of Ireland. Some ex-Phantom presenters from the pirate era have been involved with 8Radio.com. As well as Simon, they include Amber, Steve Conway, Pearl and Brian Daly.

Cork

CBC (Cork Broadcasting Company) 230m MW was the first pirate station in Cork in 1978. Also around 1978 were ABC Radio 235m medium wave (Steve Bolger) Which Later became Capitol Radio Cork and also Broadcasting was Cork City Radio (CCR) which transmitted on 261m medium wave. It later changed its name to CCLR (Cork City Local Radio).
 
Then came one station on the air waves of Cork called Radio City, which was occupied by DJs from the former CBC and CCLR stations along with some from the DJing circuit at the time of the closures of both CBC, CCLR with the introduction of the new Radio Licensing Laws which led to the closure of many pirate radio stations in Ireland. Radio City was the first station to use and switch from the medium wave transmitter to an FM transmitter.

Most of the Radio City presenters went to national and local licensed radio stations. Other notable stations that came along were radio caroline cork the longest-running pirate station of them all still on corks airwaves to this present day on the weekends on 107 fm, South Coast Radio and WBEN and even Hospital Radio in the CUH and a lot of other smaller stations growing as the FM transmission was getting ever so popular like Leeside Radio and Big Brother Radio, City View Radio.

1980s

In Cork (1982–1988) The biggest station was ERI run by the O'Connor family who ran a large engineering business called Progress Engineering based in Whites Cross with Joseph O Connor as CEO. The station began in the East Cork fishing town of Ballycotton as a summer project.

Ex-UK Pirate DJs were hired to get the station off the ground and were later replaced by Irish DJs when it grew in popularity and moved nearer Cork City to its "Sunny Bank" studio complex near Whites Cross.

The station had an incredibly clear signal on 225m MW due to its 5k transmitter which was imported from the United States and set up by Ex Radio Nordsee DJ and Engineer Robin Adcroft (Banks).

Its main rival was (1982–1984) South Coast Radio, featuring Peter Madison as the first voice on air. Southcoast also had a strong signal and very professional sound but in the end ERI won the ears of Cork mainly through solid business backing.

From 1983 to 1986 John Creedon was Programme Director and afternoon presenter. He later became a household name on RTE.

Between 1986 and closedown in 1988, ERI was driven by former Radio Nova Drivetime presenter George Talbot who introduced a more slick professional corporate Nova-like sound to the station, with new jingles and station identifications. Talbot also employed some presenters from Dublin for a while.

It became even more successful during this time and was the most listened to station in Munster attracting agency advertising alongside the local businesses.

The format was tight and well targeted to the listeners with something for everyone and was known to be the most successful station outside of Dublin with an approx half a million listeners.

ERI unsuccessfully applied for a commercial licence in the area in 1989 under the name 'Sound of the South'. Subsequently, its studio and transmission facilities were leased to a new licensed station, the then 'Radio South' in 1989, allowing this new station to come on air relatively quickly. Former ERI P.D George Talbot went to London to work at the BBC and then LBC, finally meeting up with colleague Peter Madison where they both worked drivetime/breakfast at CTFM in Kent.

Radio South was relaunched in July 1990 as 96FM and eventually bought out by County Sound in February 1991 with the original four shareholders selling all their shares to the Mallow-based station.

Outside Cork city in County Cork, the two most significant stations during the 1980s were the Bandon-based WKLR, and NCCR (North Cork Community Radio), which broadcast from the old Majestic Ballroom in Mallow. (The licensed local station C103 (originally known as 'County Sound') is a direct descendant of the unlicensed NCCR).

WKLR (West Cork Local Radio) founded in 1984, initially intended for the West Cork area, but towards the end of the station's life had extended its transmission to cover Cork city and much of the rest of Co. Cork.

The closedown night of NCCR in Mallow on 31 December 1988 was struck by tragedy when local farmer and former presenter and shareholder of the station – Pat O'Connor – who was participating in an interview – collapsed and died suddenly during a commercial break.

The station immediately announced it was closing earlier than planned "due to unforeseen circumstances". O'Connor had also been a brief national celebrity, when he was chosen as a representative of rural Ireland to guest present an edition of the 'Saturday Live' chat show on RTÉ Television in 1987.

However, his appearance meant he had to resign his involvement in the pirate NCCR to avoid controversy beforehand, and did not appear on NCCR again until the closedown night.

NCCR had come into being in 1985 when a community co-operative took over the ownership of a previous station – NCLR (North Cork Local Radio) that had been in existence since 1981.

Another well remembered pirate station in County Cork was Community Radio Youghal (CRY), whose existence, (like NCLR in Mallow) was ironically inspired by a stint in the town of RTÉ's mobile community radio station (which provided temporary community radio services during visits to dozens of towns nationwide in the 1980s).

CRY had been on air for almost a decade and was one of the longest surviving pirates in Ireland when it closed at the end of 1988. CRY returned to the airwaves (with a licence) years later in 1995.

1990s
The 1990s saw the birth of Radio Friendly. Radio Friendly provided Corkonians with music from the "Underground" DJs of Cork, some from the infamous Sir Henry's nightclub at the time and its DJs included Stevie G and Greg & Shane of Fish Go Deep. The station got its name from its owners MR P, Miss Ken D and some Djs from Dublin's Power FM. The original transmitter was the original Power 98.7FM equipment. Another big station in the late 1990s early 2000s was Kiss 105.5FM (run by Tom Donegan) which had a more commercial side than Radio Friendly and was aimed at a younger audience, such DJs such as Colin Edwards, Damien Sreenan, Dave Newman and Derek O Keeffe were regulars on this, it closed down in 2001.  The main pirate station in Cork in recent years is another Kiss (run by WKD aka Bossman), but they have been the subject of much Comreg attention and have been raided three times having broadcasting equipment confiscated. A relaunch of Kiss 94.8 lasted only 3 weeks with the station being raided once again (13/08/2008 13:00) and all equipment was confiscated while off air. This is believed to be due to the popularity of the station which poses a financial threat to other licensed broadcasters in the area. Early in 2009 Kiss returned to a new frequency of 106.5, in which they were broadcasting since 2006. This was jammed by a City Pirate called Pulse FM which had previously used this frequency which they were broadcasting since 2005. Kiss found a new frequency at the lower end of the band, 87.8, the former frequency of Galaxy FM with the same owner ( Franko aka the Man who CAN be moved....to tears) of Pulse FM who had returned onto the airwaves. Kiss moved to 88.7 in late 2009 due to a temporary licensed station about to appear on 87.7, 'too near' their previous frequency.

Since 2000

In the early 2000s a station named Freak FM broadcast temporarily near Mallow

Kiss fm went off air from 2/4/10 and returned in the summer of 2010 on lower power. 19/8/10. Kissfm ceased broadcasting again as of 1 January 2011 and briefly returned on 88.7FM and then 88.9FM for a few weeks in late 2011 but had disappeared once again. As of January 2013, Kiss FM was broadcasting once again on 104.9FM with quite a strong signal which could be heard in many part of the county as well as the city. Power was estimated at 1 kW.

A station called Radio Now had broadcast House Dance & Trance and most styles of electronica music on 87.8 MHz.  It was called Radio Now, providing "Underground" music from many of the "Underground" D.J.s of Cork.

Limerick

Limerick has had a number of pirate radio stations over the years.

The first radio stations in the region from the late 1970s to the mid-1980s were Capital Radio (3 months), RLWE(4 months), Big L (7 years), Raidio Luimni (8 years) and Hits 954 (2 years).

Other reasonably significant radio stations in the area over the years included CCR (City Centre Radio), Radio Vera, Radio Munster, SoundChannel and Mid-West Radio (a name since adopted somewhat confusingly by a legal radio station in Mayo, in the West of Ireland).

Following the biggest closedown of the pirates in Ireland in 1988, and the subsequent legalisation of local radio services in the country, many people viewed that the pirate era was consigned to the past, and Limerick became home to a single government-licensed service called Radio Limerick One which ironically later had its broadcasting licence revoked only to continue operating as a pirate station (RLO) for 10 years, being constantly raided and fined, finally ceasing transmission after 10 years early 2007 as owners and engineers ventured to other projects.

The inexplicable failure to offer more choice – Limerick had initially been earmarked for at least two stations – meant that inevitably a number of pirate stations reappeared, the biggest ones being Kiss FM (2000–2001), specialist dance station Touch 107, Radio Magic 107.6FM, Galtee Radio, Country Gold, Estuary, NCW 106, and Wave FM (2003), which later became Galaxy 105 (2004). There were also all-too-brief appearances of Q101, Power 98FM, Club FM, Fresh 103 and Enterprise Radio.

Galway

Galway's first pirate radio station was Saor Raidió Chonamara (Free Radio Connemara) which first came on the air during Oireachtas na Gaeilge 1968 as a direct response to the Irish government's inaction over Irish language broadcasting. The station used a medium wave transmitter surreptitiously imported from the Netherlands. The Irish government responded by proposing a national Irish-language radio station RTÉ Raidió na Gaeltachta which came on the air on Easter Sunday 1972. Its headquarters are now in Casla, Co. Galway.

In the summer of 1978, a pop-format pirate radio station, IRG Independent Radio Galway, staffed mostly by local university students, began broadcasting from a studio off Shop Street, Galway City. IRG remained intermittently on the air, despite halfhearted raids by Gardaí (Irish police), until the early 1980s.

In 1981, WCCR (West Coast Community Radio) began broadcasting headed by Gerry Delaney as station manager. Kevin and Mike Mulkerrins were new voices on the air along with Bob Houston, Keith Finnegan and Shane Martin. The location for WCCR was about 4 miles outside Galway City in a frozen chicken warehouse.

In 1983, Radio Renmore took to the airwaves founded by Gary Hardiman, Brendan Mee, Tom Breen which took on DJs like Brian Walsh, Mark Kavanagh. Radio Renmore was the only radio station in Galway that got advertising from both local business in Renmore and Galway city, in 1983 Snowflake Radio followed the Christmas of that year, and in the summer of 1984 Renmore Local Radio (RLR) was born, fronted by Gary Hardiman and presenter Brendan Mee and also presenter Brian Walsh. With its Galway-accented jingles advertising the station's presence on 199 metres MW, the station was a great local success.

The station was nevertheless supplanted in 1984, by the professionally backed Atlantic Sound broadcasting from Forster Street. A difference of opinion between station owner and on-air DJs led to the departure of nearly all staff, who then set up WLS Music Radio (which stood for 'West Local Station') across the street in 1985.

Shane Martin (from the now-defunct WCCR), was brought in by station manager Mick Naughton to revive Atlantic Sound and change its radio format to suit the Galway audience. Shane called in favours from local bands and DJs and entertainment friends to assist with the new makeover. Thus began a great rivalry between Atlantic Sound and WLS. It was a healthy rivalry that lasted over a year, until one Sunday morning a truck appeared outside the Atlantic Sound studios and all the gear was being loaded into it. This happened so fast, the morning DJ had no idea that he was broadcasting to nobody, The transmitter was already in the truck. Atlantic Sound was no more and WLS was the only station left to cater to the Galway audience.

In 1986 Twiggs FM came onto the airwaves, the brainchild of Shane Martin and owners of Twiggs nightclub where he worked as a nightclub DJ in Salthill, Galway. Twiggs was the first radio station to broadcast "live" bands on-air in Galway City. Shane Martin eventually left Twiggs FM and the nightclub because the original focus had changed, and with Barry Williams set up KFM about 8 miles outside Galway City.

Coast 103 became the most successful Pirate Radio station on the Irish west coast ever, reaching all the way to Limerick and beyond. Advertisers flocked to the unique sound the station delivered and audience numbers grew by the thousands. Coast 103 was the Radio Nova of the West Coast.

County Sound Radio began broadcasting from Tuam in North Galway on 17 March 1987. County Sound brought a different sound to the local radio scene. It appealed to a mixed adult audience and featured the Alfasound jinglepack of County Sound Radio in Surrey UK. County Sound Radio moved to Galway City early in 1988 and broadcast live 24 hours per day until 31 December 1988 when the then Minister for Communications Ray Burke introduced new legislation aimed at suppressing pirate stations.

These CHR/AC stations, mostly headed and staffed by professional broadcasters with experience in Israel, United States, Ireland and Britain, brought the concept of community-based pirate radio in Galway to an end (with the exception of NUIG College Campus Radio, FlirtFM), but heralded the new and legal local radio format which survives in the legally broadcasting Galway Bay FM, which came on the air in 1989 (Broadcast as "Radio West" 1989–93).

Other stations in Galway during the 1980s included Emerald Radio, Candy FM in Ballinasloe and GDR in Loughrea.

After the official Irish Government closedown of all Pirate Radio stations on 31 Dec 1988, there was very little pirate activity in the city with the exception of Quincentinial Radio, Run by Steve Marshall and Tony Allan when the voice of Shane Martin was heard once again at 6:07 pm, nine days into the new legislation with the assistance of Tony Allan voiced liners in reference to "Galway DJ's prefer not to be unemployed". Radio Friendly was also heard (both short lived) and the more enduring (but intermittent) Radio Pirate Woman. In late 2007 a new licensed radio station began broadcasting in Galway. I- Radio (I 102–104) has been hugely successful with young listeners.

Waterford
Waterford was home to three long-running stations – Suirside, ABC Radio and WLR-FM, the latter winning the franchise to run the legal station for the Waterford City and County area after the competition run in early 1989 (following the introduction of the Radio and Television Act, 1988). ABC Radio which began operation in the nearby coastal town Tramore in 1982 had a distinct UK flavour with many English DJs and a notably slicker high tempo style than the other two. Later that same year they imported a high power professional medium wave transmitter from the US, enabling it to cover Waterford City with a strong signal and, due to its coastal location, also provide a strong signal as far as Dungarvan and Rosslare.  ABC Radio moved to a new studio in Waterford City in 1984.

ABC Radio, which changed its name to 'ABC The Hot FM' in 1986, was the first station in Ireland to broadcast in FM Stereo (from its inception in 1982), and latterly developed a network of 6 FM transmitters and 2 AMs, covering counties Waterford and Wexford. ABC was also the first station outside Dublin to employ Optimod audio processors – which at the time gave the station a unique, loud, high quality sound. The station also experimented with AM Stereo on its 1 kW Gates transmitter. ABC closed at 3 pm on 29 December 1987 as legislation came into force on the 31st, and it would take all the following day to travel to every transmitter site and turn them off.

WLR-FM was the first continuous broadcast operation in the City or County. Full-time broadcasting by WLR commenced in 1978 with the station initially being located at Killotteran, just outside the city. After a few months WLR suffered a raid by the authorities on 28 November 1978, but quickly returned to the airwaves. WLR moved to studios in the city at Wellington street, and later moved to Georges street (next door to what became the original location of the licensed WLR FM. WLR would settle firmly into a middle of the road station complete with local news and chat.

Suirside (which was a breakaway group from WLR) was unusual in that at one time it broadcast on Short Wave in addition to the usual FM and MW frequencies. In later years Suirside relaunched under the name 'Crystal City Sound'. A short time later the station relaunched again as NCR (Nolan Cahill Radio), NCR closed down on 26 December 1988.

The Waterford town of Dungarvan also had a long-running pirate community radio station 'DCR' during the 1980s. DCR, aka Dungarvan Community Radio, originally ran from a house in Byrneville in Dungarvan, owned by James Farrell. Dungarvan Community Radio began in the very early 80s with many local people having their own shows with many types of music. DJs such as Timmy Ryan, Ian Noctor and Sean Organ had some of their first shows on DCR. DCR then ran from a music store called Ben O'Neill's in the mid 80's which is still in existence.

In the late 1990s Waterford had one of the more significant pirate stations in the country at the time with the professionally run 'ABC Power 104', which targeted a youth audience. The station launched in December 1995, lasting until October 2001, and included some personnel from the original ABC radio of the 1980s.

ABC Power 104 made the issue of a youth licence for the area an election issue in the Waterford constituency prior to the 1997 General Election, this included a petition signing campaign. Shortly afterward the IRTC decided that the Southeast was to be chosen as a pilot for a youth regional licence, which subsequently was awarded to Beat 102–103. A number of former ABC Power 104 presenters went on to work for the new licensed youth station. In October 2011, some 10 years after the station had ceased its service, a special 2-hour show was compiled and mixed by Steve Grant - former ABC Power 104 presenter - which aired on Beat 102 103 on 28 October 2011. The show featured a run-through of a lot of the hits that made the air during the station's reign.

In 2007 Waterford saw its own dedicated Metal and Rock station appear on 99.9 MHz, the station was called MetalHertz FM and ran every weekend until voluntarily coming off air in 2009 to explore the possibility of securing a temporary broadcast licence, unfortunately, the cost involved in such a venture was deemed impossible at the time for those involved so the station was put to rest. Some of the people involved went on to do the odd gig on temp stations and some production work elsewhere.

In December 2011, Waterford saw OpenTempoFM launch on 99.9 MHz which later re-located to 105.1 MHz. On the station Open Genre music broadcast to a radius of between 20 and 30 km, covering all of the city of Waterford and most of the county. The station still broadcasts 7 days a week, has up to 40 people involved, delivering live and prerecorded shows with a multitude of genres. OpenTempoFM is the longest running pirate radio station Ireland has seen in over 30 years.

Louth
Kiss 106 launched from Dundalk in December 1987 and has continued under various guises as such until the present day with some short breaks in service. Wild Country, 106.6 The Frog and Lite 101.5 FM are all part of the Eye Media Group and have also operated alongside Kiss 106 as sister stations since around 2003. Currently, Kiss FM is back on the air on 101.6, 103.9 and 104.2FM as Feel Good Radio.
KISS was taken off air on Friday 25 June 2010 By both Comreg and Ofcom and only returned to the air briefly in late 2014.

Storm 106 is a breakaway from Kiss 106 Dundalk by one of the original shareholders of Kiss 106 launching in 2002 and still on air to this present day as Stormnortheast.com an online internet radio dance station with a similar radio format to the old Nitetime programming from 7pm to 7am Kiss 106 of 1999.

Other stations
From the mid-1990s on, the majority of pirate stations ran a dance music radio format with Galaxy 107, Energy 106, Sunset, NSR 105, Kiss 103, Club FM and later Pulse 103 battling for supremacy and enjoying short spells at the top of the pile in Dublin. Leading Dublin non-dance pirates included Coast FM, DLR/Hits 106, Sun FM and Freedom FM.

Outside Dublin most activity was to be found in the border regions although Cork, Limerick, Waterford as well as smaller towns like Castlebar (Static FM 106, Kiss FM, Pulse FM, Future FM), Tralee, Enniscrone (Atlantic FM 107.1), Wexford (Ultra FM) and Enniscorthy (Enniscorthy Local) all had varying levels of pirate activity through this period.

Northern Ireland
During the early 1970s there were several political "clandestine" stations operated by various nationalist and loyalist organisations however most of these were short lived. Later there were several attempts to establish commercial pirates in NI but the authorities quickly moved against these too. (Penalties for pirate broadcasting under UK law were a lot harsher than in Ireland.) Some of these stations subsequently moved across the border and broadcast into Northern Ireland from the Republic.

At one point there were over 15 stations doing so. Surprisingly there were only a handful of (mostly short lived) "political" stations South of the border as it was felt that the authorities were less likely to be tolerant of such stations. One such station transmitted to Fermanagh and South Tyrone during the Westminster election of 1981 that saw IRA hunger striker Bobby Sands elected as an MP. The longest running illegal station in Northern Ireland was Belfast's Irish language station "Raidió Fáilte" (lit. "Radio Welcome"). In 2005 the authorities decided to license Raidió Fáilte, an action which would have been unthinkable before the Northern Ireland Peace Process

Offshore Radio
While offshore pirates were rarer in Ireland, they still existed, and many notable UK offshore stations had a connection with Ireland. Both Radio Atlanta and Radio Caroline were built on board ships that were docked in (and made initial test transmissions from) a private Irish port at Greenore in the Republic of Ireland. The Dutch stations Radio Paradijs and REM island were also fitted out in Irish ports while Laser 558 had some Irish staff and financial backing.  Another offshore station located at various locations off the coast of Scotland in international waters, later identified itself as Radio Scotland and Ireland when its radio ship moved to anchorage off the west coast and within range of Ireland (for a time they anchored off Northern Ireland). During the mid-1960s there were unconfirmed reports of test broadcasts from Irish offshore stations like "Radio Shannon" and "Radio Lambay" but such transmissions if they ever took place were probably the work of land-based radio enthusiasts. Some UK offshore stations, particularly Radio Scotland and Radio Caroline North had a sizable following in Ireland.

See also 
 Pirate radio in Kerry
 Wireless Telegraphy Acts Law concerning pirate radio.

References

Further reading
Radio Radio, Peter Mulryan, Dublin Borderline Publications

External links
 A–Z of Irish Pirates
 Radiowaves.FM A long-running Irish radio tribute and resource website
 Listen to recordings of The Anorak Hour from Phantom FM
 A history of NSR 105, an unlicensed pirate radio station that operated in Dublin from 1991 to 1993

Ireland